József Kovács may refer to:
 József Kovács (hurdler) (1911–1990), Hungarian hurdler and 1934 European champion
 József Kovács (footballer, born 1923), Hungarian football player
 József Kovács (runner) (1926–1987), Hungarian long-distance runner and 1956 Olympic medalist
 József Kovács (footballer, born 1949), Hungarian football player and 1972 Olympic medalist
 József Kovács (politician) (born 1951), Hungarian physician and politician, Member of Parliament (since 2010)
 József Kovács (wrestler) (1929–1991), Hungarian Olympic wrestler